Burkman is a surname. Notable people with the surname include:

Jack Burkman (born 1965/66), American political consultant
Josh Burkman (born 1980), American mixed martial artist
Roger Burkman (born 1958), American basketball player

See also
Berkman